Van Praagh is a surname. Notable people with the surname include:

James Van Praagh (born 1958), American writer
Peggy van Praagh (1910–1990), English dancer and choreographer
Stella Van Praagh, pediatric cardiologist and pathologist

See also
Van Praag

Surnames of Dutch origin